

fe

feb-fel
febantel (INN)
febarbamate (INN)
febuprol (INN)
febuverine (INN)
febuxostat (INN)
feclemine (INN)
feclobuzone (INN)
fedotozine (INN)
fedrilate (INN)
felbamate (INN)
felbatol
felbinac (INN)
feldene
felipyrine (INN)
felodipine (INN)
felvizumab (INN)
felypressin (INN)

fem
femara
femara (Novartis)
femcet
femhrt
feminone
femogen
femoxetine (INN)
fempatch
femring
femstat

fen

fena-fenb
fenabutene (INN)
fenacetinol (INN)
fenaclon (INN)
fenadiazole (INN)
fenaftic acid (INN)
fenalamide (INN)
fenalcomine (INN)
fenamifuril (INN)
fenamisal (INN)
fenamole (INN)
fenaperone (INN)
fenbendazole (INN)
fenbenicillin (INN)
fenbufen (INN)
fenbutrazate (INN)

fenc-fenh
fencamfamin (INN)
fencarbamide (INN)
fencibutirol (INN)
fenclexonium metilsulfate (INN)
fenclofenac (INN)
fenclofos (INN)
fenclonine (INN)
fenclorac (INN)
fenclozic acid (INN)
fendiline (INN)
fendosal (INN)
feneritrol (INN)
fenestrel (INN)
fenethazine (INN)
fenetradil (INN)
fenetylline (INN)
fenflumizol (INN)
fenfluramine (INN)
fenfluthrin (INN)
fengabine (INN)
fenharmane (INN)

feni-feno
fenimide (INN)
feniodium chloride (INN)
fenipentol (INN)
fenirofibrate (INN)
fenisorex (INN)
fenleuton (INN)
fenmetozole (INN)
fenmetramide (INN)
fenobam (INN)
fenocinol (INN)
fenoctimine (INN)
fenofibrate (INN)
fenoldopam (INN)
fenoprofen (INN)
fenoterol (INN)
fenoverine (INN)
fenoxazoline (INN)
fenoxedil (INN)
fenoxypropazine (INN)
fenozolone (INN)

fenp-feny
fenpentadiol (INN)
fenperate (INN)
fenpipalone (INN)
fenpipramide (INN)
fenpiprane (INN)
fenpiverinium bromide (INN)
fenprinast (INN)
fenproporex (INN)
fenprostalene (INN)
fenquizone (INN)
fenretinide (INN)
fenspiride (INN)
fentanyl (INN)
fentiazac (INN)
fenticlor (INN)
fenticonazole (INN)
fentonium bromide (INN)
fenyramidol (INN)
fenyripol (INN)

fep-fet
fepentolic acid (INN)
fepitrizol (INN)
fepradinol (INN)
feprazone (INN)
fepromide (INN)
feprosidnine (INN)
feridex I.V.® (also known as Endorem® and ferumoxides), discontinued by AMAG Pharma in November 2008
fermagate (INN)
ferndex
fernisolone-P
fernisone
ferpifosate sodium (INN)
ferric (59 Fe) citrate injection (INN)
ferric carboxymaltose (USAN, INN)
ferric fructose (INN)
ferriseltz
ferrlecit
ferrocholinate (INN)
ferropolimaler (INN)
ferroquine (INN)
ferrotrenine (INN)
fertinex
fertinorm HP
fertirelin (INN)
ferumoxytol (INN)
fesoterodine fumarate (USAN)
fetoxilate (INN)

fex-fez
fexicaine (INN)
fexinidazole (INN)
fexofenadine (INN)
fezakinumab (USAN, INN)
fezatione (INN)
fezolamine (INN)

References